Middlesex County may refer to:

In Canada:
Middlesex County, Ontario

In Jamaica:
Middlesex County, Jamaica

In the United Kingdom:
Middlesex, a historic county in England

In the United States:
Middlesex County, Connecticut 
Middlesex County, Massachusetts, the most populous Middlesex County in the United States 
Middlesex County, New Jersey 
Middlesex County, Virginia

See also
Middlesex (disambiguation)

United States county name disambiguation pages